The tenth season of M*A*S*H aired Mondays at 9:00–9:30 PM E.T. on CBS.

Cast

Episodes

Notes

References

External links 
 List of M*A*S*H (season 10) episodes at the Internet Movie Database

1981 American television seasons
1982 American television seasons
MASH 10